João Diogo Gomes de Freitas (born 28 February 1988), known as João Diogo, is a Portuguese professional footballer who plays as a right-back.

Club career

Marítimo
Born in Funchal, João Diogo joined local C.S. Marítimo's youth system in 1996, at the age of 8. He spent the better part of his first four seasons as a senior with the reserves, in the third division.

João Diogo made his Primeira Liga debut with the Madeirans on 13 January 2012, playing the full 90 minutes in a 1–1 away draw against F.C. Paços de Ferreira. It would be the first of just two league appearances during the campaign, the other also coming against the same opponent.

From 2013–14 onwards, João Diogo became Marítimo's first choice in his position. In 2015 and 2016, he started and scored in Taça da Liga finals against S.L. Benfica, but lost both games held in Coimbra (1–2 and 2–6, respectively).

Belenenses
On 25 May 2016, João Diogo signed for C.F. Os Belenenses. He scored twice from 31 appearances in his first season, helping to a 14th-place finish.

João Diogo spent the first part of the following campaign on the sidelines, nursing an injury. In late December 2017, he terminated his contract.

Romania
In January 2018, João Diogo joined CS Gaz Metan Mediaș of the Romanian Liga I. On 7 February of the following year he signed with FC Farul Constanța in the same country (Liga II), owned by former Romanian international Ciprian Marica.

International career
João Diogo represented Portugal at under-21 level, appearing for the nation at the 2009 Lusofonia Games.

References

External links

1988 births
Living people
Sportspeople from Funchal
Portuguese footballers
Madeiran footballers
Association football defenders
Primeira Liga players
Liga Portugal 2 players
Segunda Divisão players
C.S. Marítimo players
C.F. Os Belenenses players
G.D. Estoril Praia players
Associação Académica de Coimbra – O.A.F. players
Liga I players
Liga II players
CS Gaz Metan Mediaș players
FCV Farul Constanța players
Slovak Super Liga players
FC Spartak Trnava players
Portugal under-21 international footballers
Portuguese expatriate footballers
Expatriate footballers in Romania
Expatriate footballers in Slovakia
Portuguese expatriate sportspeople in Romania
Portuguese expatriate sportspeople in Slovakia